The Mathieu transformations make up a subgroup of canonical transformations preserving the differential form

The transformation is named after the French mathematician Émile Léonard Mathieu.

Details 

where . When  a Mathieu transformation becomes a Lagrange point transformation.

See also 
 Canonical transformation

References 
 
 

Mechanics
Hamiltonian mechanics